is an anime television series produced by Tatsunoko Productions for Fuji TV. It ran from September 7, 1980, to September 27, 1981. Twelve-year-old Rin Yuki loyally supported his father when the world laughed at the scientist for saying that Earth was about to be invaded from outer space. But Rin did not expect to become personally involved—until he met Takoro, the strange young "deputy sheriff" from another world who was on the trail of notorious space criminals. There were only four Kurodako Brothers, but they plotted to use their alien science and natural shape-changing powers to become the secret masters of Earth. With Takoro's help, Rin became the mighty super-hero, Muteking, to foil their schemes.

The series was televised in Italy under the title of simply Muteking.

An English dub of episode one was also made, apparently in an unsuccessful attempt to sell the series to the United States. In this one-episode dubbed version (which has been posted on YouTube in three parts), Rin Yuki is named "Scooter Loon," and his father is renamed "Linus Loon."

In 2019, Tatsunoko announced a reboot of the series titled Muteking the Dancing Hero that aired from October 3 to December 19, 2021.

Staff

 Original story: Tatsunoko Production
 Executive producer: Kenji Yoshida
 Planning: Ippei Kuri, Shigeru Yanagawa
 Producers: Ippei Kuri, Tomoyuki Miyata
 Production supervisors: Minoru Uchima, Minoru Uno, Tsuneo Tamura
 Scripts: Shigeru Yanagawa, Kazuo Sato, Akiyoshi Sakai, Seiya Yamazaki, Takeshi Shudo, Yu Yamamoto et al.
 Episode direction: Hiroshi Sasagawa, Masayuki Hayashi, Koichi Mashimo, Yutaka Kagawa, Shinya Sadamitsu, Yoshizo Tsuda, Hidehito Ueda, Kenjiro Yoshida, Kazuo Yamazaki, Masakazu Higuchi et al.
 Character designs: Ippei Kuri, Akiko Shimomoto
 Mechanical design: Kunio Okawara
 Key animation supervisor: Sadao Miyamoto
 Key animation director: Shizuo Kawai
 Art director: Kikuko Tada
 Music: Koba Hayashi
 Produced and distributed by: Tatsunoko Production Co., Ltd. / Fuji Telecasting Co., Ltd.

Cast

Rin Yuki: Kazuhiko Inoue
Takoro: Yumiko Uzaki
Dr. Dankichi Yuki: Isamu Tanonaka
Koharu Yuki: Kazue Komiya
Sonny Yuki: Rokuro Naya
Mitchi: Takako Tsutsui
Nubon: Takemi Nakamura
Takokichi: Toru Ohira
Takomaru: Shigeru Tsuji
Takosaku: Shin Aomori
Takomi: Makoto Kōsaka

Episode list

Reboot
In 2019, Tatsunoko announced a reboot of the series titled Muteking the Dancing Hero that was going to air in 2020. The companies Tatsunoko and Horipro hosted an audition for who will voice the titular character Muteking; the winner will voice the character and will also have a singing debut with character songs, and will get a contract with Horipro. HoriPro was accepting applications for the audition until July 19, 2019, and after several rounds, the final round took place on September 8.

The reboot is animated by Tatsunoko and Tezuka Productions and directed by Yūzō Satō, with Ryōsuke Takahashi serving as chief director and Hiroshi Sasagawa serving as executive director, Masafumi Satō serving as assistant director and battle dance director, Yūji Kondō supervising series' scripts, and Takamitsu Shimazaki and Takeshi Masuda composing the series' music. The opening theme song, "Labyrinth", is performed by Orange Range, while the ending theme song, "Kibō no Uta" (Song of Hope), is performed by Kalma. It aired from October 3 to December 19, 2021 on TV Osaka and other channels. Funimation streamed the anime.

Episode list

DJ

Notes

References

External links
 

1980 anime television series debuts
Action anime and manga
Adventure anime and manga
Fuji TV original programming
Funimation
Science fiction anime and manga
Tatsunoko Production
Television shows set in San Francisco
Tezuka Productions